The Ducati 1198 is a sport bike made by Ducati from 2009 to 2011. For the 2011 model year there were two models: the 1198 and 1198SP (replacing the 1198S). The 1198 shared design elements with its predecessor 1098, but has more power and torque, redesigned wheels, lighter headlights, traction control, and lighter fairings (on the S model), and a few minor paint changes. One carryover from its 998 heritage is the distinctive single-sided swingarm.

Performance
The 1198 R makes a manufacturer claimed  and 134.4 Nm (99.1 lbf) torque.

Specifications
All specifications are manufacturer claimed unless noted otherwise:

Motorsport
Carlos Checa won both the riders and manufacturers title during the 2011 Superbike World Championship season.

References

1198
Motorcycles introduced in 2009
Sport bikes